The Cantor medal of the Deutsche Mathematiker-Vereinigung is named in honor of Georg Cantor, the first president of the society. It is awarded at most every second year during the yearly meetings of the society. The prize winners are mathematicians who are associated with the German language.

Prize winners

 1990 Karl Stein
 1992 Jürgen Moser
 1994 Erhard Heinz
 1996 Jacques Tits
 1999 Volker Strassen
 2002 Yuri Manin
 2004 Friedrich Hirzebruch
 2006 Hans Föllmer
 2008 Hans Grauert
 2010 Matthias Kreck
 2012 Michael Struwe
 2014 Herbert Spohn
 2017 Gerd Faltings
 2019 Hélène Esnault
 2021 Martin Grötschel

See also

 List of mathematics awards

References

German awards
Mathematics awards